Code complete can refer to:

 A stage of the software release life cycle
 Code Complete, a book on software development by Steve McConnell

See also 
 code completion - a practical feature of IDEs during the process of a programming
 autocomplete#In source code editors
 intelligent code completion